In complex analysis, a branch of mathematics, the residue at infinity is a residue of a holomorphic function on an annulus having an infinite external radius.  The infinity  is a point added to the local space  in order to render it compact (in this case it is a one-point compactification). This space denoted  is isomorphic to the Riemann sphere. One can use the residue at infinity to calculate some integrals.

Definition
Given a holomorphic function f on an annulus  (centered at 0, with inner radius  and infinite outer radius), the residue at infinity of the function f can be defined in terms of the usual residue as follows:

Note that , we have

Motivation

One might first guess that the definition of the residue of f(z) at infinity should just be the residue of f(1/z) at z=0. However, the reason that we consider instead -f(1/z)/z2 is that one does not take residues of functions, but of differential forms, i.e. the residue of f(z)dz at infinity is the residue of f(1/z)d(1/z)=-f(1/z)dz/z2 at z=0.

See also 
 Riemann sphere
 Algebraic variety
 Residue theorem

References 

 Murray R. Spiegel, Variables complexes, Schaum, 
 Henri Cartan, Théorie élémentaire des fonctions analytiques d'une ou plusieurs variables complexes, Hermann, 1961
 Mark J. Ablowitz & Athanassios S. Fokas, Complex Variables: Introduction and Applications (Second Edition), 2003, P211-212.

Complex analysis